This article lists the Leaders of political parties in the United Kingdom to provide insight into the politics of the United Kingdom. It contains details including which party the leader belongs to, the leader's seat, and which form of leadership that person holds.

Leaders in the House of Commons
National party leaders are usually members of parliament. Some minor parties (including Welsh, Scottish and Northern Irish parties) designate a separate leader in the House of Commons, or their leader is absent from the House of Commons and holds membership of a devolved body.

 Leads the party in the House of Commons. The leader of the Scottish National Party (SNP), Nicola Sturgeon, has sat as a Member of the Scottish Parliament (MSP) for Glasgow Southside since 3 May 2007.
 In accordance with party policy, no elected Sinn Féin members of parliament have ever sat in the House of Commons.
 Leads the party in the House of Commons. Plaid Cymru's leader, Adam Price, has sat as a member of the Senedd (Welsh Parliament) for Carmarthen East and Dinefwr since 5 May 2016.
 Caroline Lucas has been the Green Party of England and Wales' only MP since taking her seat in May 2010. At the time, and until 3 September 2012, she was also the leader of the party. From 2 September 2016 to 4 September 2018, Lucas was co-leader of the party alongside Jonathan Bartley. She has remained leader in the House of Commons due to being the party's only MP, unrelated to her former status as (co-)leader. Carla Denyer and Adrian Ramsay have been co-leaders of the party since October 2021.

Leaders in the House of Lords

Leaders in the Scottish Parliament

Leaders in the Senedd

Leaders in the Northern Ireland Assembly

 The leader of the Democratic Unionist Party (DUP), Jeffrey Donaldson has sat in the House of Commons as an MP for Lagan Valley since 1997.
 The leader of the Social Democratic and Labour Party (SDLP), Colum Eastwood has sat in the House of Commons as an MP for Foyle since 2019.

References

 
United Kingdom